Stewart Walker Cliburn (born December 19, 1956) is an American former professional baseball relief pitcher who played for the California Angels of Major League Baseball (MLB) in all or parts of three seasons spanning 1984–1988. He is currently the pitching coach for the Chicago Dogs of the American Association of Professional Baseball.

Career
The Pittsburgh Pirates selected Cliburn in the fourth round of the 1977 MLB Draft out of Delta State University. He spent five seasons in their Minor League system as a starting pitcher, before being released at the end of spring training in 1982. He signed with the Angels three weeks later, and by 1984 he had converted into a reliever. He made his major league debut as a September call-up that year, appearing in one game against the Kansas City Royals, pitching two innings and giving up three runs.

The 1985 season was Cliburn's best, as he had a 9–3 record and a 2.09 ERA along with six saves. However, he suffered from arm problems in 1986 and wound up back in the minor leagues. He then was released by the Angels after the 1987 season, but was re-signed a month later.

The year 1988 saw Cliburn return to the Angels, in what would prove to be his only full season at the major league level. Working as a long reliever, he had a 4–2 record and a 4.07 ERA. He returned to the minor leagues in 1989, pitching two more seasons for the Angels and Texas Rangers organizations. After that, he had a brief stint with the Daytona Beach Explorers of the Senior Professional Baseball Association in 1990, where he formed a battery with his brother Stan.

Cliburn has been a minor league pitching coach since 1991, spending two seasons in the Angels' organization before joining the Minnesota Twins in 1993, spending that season with the Elizabethton Twins of the Appalachian League. He has coached at every minor league level for the Twins, reaching their Triple-A affiliate Rochester Red Wings in 2006–08. Stew returned to their double-A affiliate New Britain Rock Cats in 2009 to aid the development of younger pitchers. As of the 2016 season, Stew returned with the Red Wings as their pitching coach. His brother was also a coach in the Twins' organization. He was hired as the pitching coach of the Chicago Dogs for the 2021 season.

Personal life
He is the twin brother of catcher Stan Cliburn, who also played in the majors.

References

External links
, or Retrosheet
 Stew Cliburn at SABR (Baseball BioProject)

1956 births
Living people
American expatriate baseball players in Canada
Baseball coaches from Mississippi
Baseball players from Jackson, Mississippi
Buffalo Bisons (minor league) players
California Angels players
Daytona Beach Explorers players
Delta State Statesmen baseball players
Edmonton Trappers players
Holyoke Millers players
Major League Baseball pitchers
Midland Angels players
Minor league baseball coaches
Nashua Angels players
Oklahoma City 89ers players
Palm Springs Angels players
Portland Beavers players
Salem Pirates players
Shreveport Captains players
Spokane Indians players
Sportspeople from Fort Myers, Florida
Sportspeople from Jackson, Mississippi
Twin sportspeople